The Bajaj Kristal is a scooterette produced and sold in India by Bajaj Auto.

Kristal